Christopher West (born 1969) is a Catholic author and speaker, best known for his work on Pope John Paul II’s series of audience addresses entitled Theology of the Body.

About
Christopher West has been delivering lectures since 1997, mostly on topics such as Christian anthropology, the Creed, morality, sacraments, marriage, sexuality, and family life.  He has also spoken on national radio and on television. He is a cofounder of the Theology of the Body Institute, which offers graduate level courses and other training programs on the Theology of the Body. West's lectures oppose gay sexual practices and the use of contraception because West says sex without the possibility of pregnancy is a sin.

He and his wife, Wendy, reside in Lancaster County, Pennsylvania (USA), and have five children.

Education
West graduated from Lancaster Catholic High School in 1988.  He received a Bachelor of Arts in Anthropology in 1992 from the University of Maryland. In 1996 he was certified as an Instructor of Marriage Preparation from the Archdiocese of Washington, D.C. In 1997, he obtained a Master of Theological Studies at the Pontifical John Paul II Institute for Studies on Marriage and Family at The Catholic University of America, and became a Certified Catechist by the Archdiocese of Denver Catechetical School. He has also received an honorary doctorate from DeSales University. In December 2019 West received a Doctor of Theology degree from Pontifex University, which is based in Atlanta, GA.

Commentaries

Cecilia LeChevallier, Coordinator, Marriage Preparation and Natural Family Planning, Diocese of Camden, NJ commented that "Christopher West is able to synthesize the Theology of the Body in an understandable and exciting way that gets people excited about it and excited about living it."

Charles J. Chaput, O.F.M. Cap. Archbishop of Philadelphia says that "Christopher West’s keen grasp of John Paul II’s Theology of the Body and his ability to make it accessible to others is changing lives, strengthening marriages, and renewing people’s faith in the Church across the country and internationally." More recently, he said: "I’ve known and respected Christopher for many years. He served with good effect on my staff in Denver early in my tenure there. He’s done a wonderful job translating John Paul II’s Theology of the Body into popular practice."

Theologian David L. Schindler charged that West promotes a "pansexualist tendency" that ties all important human and supernatural activity back to sex without making necessary distinctions.

Moral theologian Dr. Janet Smith defended West, saying his work is "completely sound" and that she found Schindler's response "puzzling."  Smith, in her response to Schindler's critique, says that Schindler "provides a list of his objections to West’s theology without citing one text to substantiate his charges...As it stands, I do not find that his concerns correspond with what I have read in West’s work or heard in his lectures."

Dr. Alice von Hildebrand, widow of Catholic theologian Dietrich von Hildebrand, has said West's approach has become too self-assured. She criticized his presentations as irreverent and insensitive to the "tremendous dangers" of concupiscence.

Theologian Michael Waldstein, who wrote the definitive translation of The Theology of the Body, addressed Schindler’s remarks in an essay published on InsideCatholic.com. Waldstein said that Schindler’s essay was a "blanket negative statement" that made "sweeping accusations" against a position he did not recognize as West’s.

Justin Cardinal Rigali, Archbishop Emeritus of Philadelphia, and Kevin Rhoades, Bishop of Fort Wayne-South Bend, issued a joint statement in support of West's work.

They said,
"We are convinced that John Paul II's Theology of the Body is a treasure for the Church, indeed a gift of the Holy Spirit for our time. Yet, its scholarly language needs to be 'translated' into more accessible categories if the average person is to benefit from it. To do this is the specific mission of the Theology of the Body Institute, and we believe that Christopher West, the Institute's popular lecturer and spokesman, has been given a particular charism to carry out this mission. With great skill as a presenter, with keen insight as a thinker, and with profound reverence for the mystery of human sexuality, he has been able to reach thousands in our sexually wounded culture with the Gospel of salvation in Christ."

Bishop Ronald Gainer of West's hometown Roman Catholic Diocese of Harrisburg, wrote, in his Letter of Good Standing: 
"Through his careful and thorough study of the teachings of Saint John Paul, Mr. West makes a unique contribution by his amazing gift of translating the profound truths of the Theology of the Body into language that is precise, compelling and clearly understandable to every reader and listener. His gift of teaching is totally faithful to the theological and spiritual legacy of our late Holy Father, now a canonized saint.

"As his Diocesan Bishop, I eagerly express my deep respect for Mr. West and I recommend him as one who lives faithfully the message he so effectively communicates. I am confident that, as countless others have, you will discover rich catechetical treasures through his ministry, The Cor Project, which exists to help men and women across the globe learn, live, and share the teachings of Saint John Paul Il’s Theology of the Body."

West also responded to many of the critiques, acknowledging that "so long as we are on earth, we will always have to battle with concupiscence" and conceding "In some of my earliest lectures and tapes, I confess that I did not emphasize this important point clearly enough." However, he continues with the rhetorical question, taken from Veritatis Splendor 103, "Of which man are we speaking?" and discusses the teaching of John Paul II that "[Christ] has given us the possibility of realizing the entire truth of our being; he has set our freedom free from the domination of concupiscence."

On January 31, 2012, West released a book entitled At the Heart of the Gospel: Reclaiming the Body for the New Evangelization. Christoph Cardinal Schönborn, Cardinal Archbishop Of Vienna; General Editor, Catechism of the Catholic Church and Grand Chancellor, International Theological Institute for Studies on Marriage and the Family, gave the following endorsement for the book:

"The light of the Gospel, which is a clear but at times painful light, can illumine human sexuality to its very depth in order to transform it and bring it to its full beauty. Here lies the great strength of Blessed John Paul II’s Theology of the Body. In this peaceful and positive response to critics, Christopher West proves once again that he is a faithful and inspiring interpreter and communicator of this great pope’s teaching, a teaching so urgently needed for an effective proclamation of the Gospel."

In 2013, West released Fill These Hearts, which addresses the idea of Christianity as a repressive, anti-sex religion and presents that the restless yearnings felt in one's bodies and spirits are the cry of one's heart for God. The book's release was followed by a series of cultural events around the United States featuring West and musical act Mike Mangione and the Union that combined art, music and theological reflection. Colleen Carroll Campbell, author of My Sisters the Saints: A Spiritual Memoir, said Christopher West "is a gifted and effective evangelist with a passion for tackling one of the greatest obstacles to belief today: the heresy that Christianity is a joyless, rule-bound religion. Not so, argues West, in this timely, powerful book. Drawing upon Scripture, the saints and the glimmers of truth in pop culture, West reminds us that Christianity is essentially a love story, and Christian sexual ethics exist to help us fulfill, not repress, our deepest desires. For anyone who has ever doubted that Christ’s call to purity of heart is good news, Fill These Hearts will prove a surprising and consoling read, one with the potential to change your life as well as your mind."

On April 15, 2015, West released his first eBook and first paperback under The Cor Project imprint, Pope Francis to Go: Bite-Sized Morsels from The Joy of the Gospel. Using Pope Francis’s apostolic exhortation The Joy of the Gospel, Scripture, the Catechism of the Catholic Church, the writings of saints and other popes, and the lens of John Paul II's Theology of the Body, West presents 150 quotes from Pope Francis that map out the "Way of Beauty" that is at the heart of the New Evangelization.

"Thanks to Christopher West’s new book, Pope Francis to Go, we can draw deeply from the well of the great heart of Pope Francis. Christopher’s prayerful and powerful commentary on The Joy of the Gospel offers practical insights on not only how to share the good news, but more importantly, how to live it," said Jason Evert, author, speaker and cofounder of The Chastity Project.

Books
 (2020) Our Bodies Tell God's Story: Discovering the Divine Plan for Love, Sex, and Gender 
 (2018) Eclipse of the Body: How we Lost the Meaning of Sex, Gender, Marriage, & Family (And How to Reclaim It)
 (2018) Word Made Flesh: A Companion to the Sunday Readings (Cycle C) eBook/paperback 2018 
 (2015) Pope Francis To Go: Bite-Sized Morsels from The Joy of the Gospel eBook/paperback 2014 
 (2013) Fill These Hearts: God, Sex and the Universal Longing 2013 
 (2012) At the Heart of the Gospel: Reclaiming the Body for the New Evangelization 2012 
 (2008) Heaven's Song 2008 
 (2007) The Love that Satisfies 2007 
 (2004) Theology of the Body for Beginners, 2004 
 (2004) Good News About Sex and Marriage 2004 
 (2003) Theology of the Body Explained : A Commentary on John Paul II's "Gospel of the Body" 2003 
 (2007) Theology of the Body Explained : A Commentary on John Paul II's Man and Woman He Created Them'' 2007

References

External links
 ChristopherWest.com
 TheologyOfTheBody.net
 ABC News interview May 9, 2009
 The Cor Project

Living people
1969 births
American Roman Catholics
American religious writers
Catholic University of America alumni